The National Association of Hispanic Journalists (NAHJ) is a Washington, D.C.-based organization dedicated to the advancement of Hispanic and Latino journalists in the United States and Puerto Rico.  It was established in 1984.

NAHJ has approximately 2,300 members, including working journalists, journalism students, other media-related professionals and journalism educators. Its president in 2012–2019 was Hugo Balta, Coordinating Producer for ESPN.

Under the leadership of Juan González in 2002-2004, NAHJ created the Parity Project to assist news organizations in hiring and retaining Hispanic journalists and improving coverage of the Hispanic communities across the U.S. NAHJ is one of the few journalist associations to take a stand against media consolidation, largely due to the influence of Gonzalez and former presidents Verónica Villafañe (2004–2006) and Rafael Olmeda (2006–2008). NAHJ is a former partner organization of Unity Journalists of Color, Inc.

Hall of Fame
In annual awards since 2000, the NAHJ recognizes great achievements.

For 2013, David Gonzales and Gilbert Bailon were honored.  Previous honorees (with short notes in "quotes" being NAHJ website wordings) are:

2013:
David Gonzales
Gilbert Bailon

2012:  
California Chicano News Media Association, first organization to achieve the award.

2011:
Ernest Sotomayor: "Assistant Dean for Career Services at Columbia University Graduate School of Journalism"

2010:
Ray Suarez: "Senior Correspondent, PBS NewsHour"
Gloria Campos: "Anchor, WFAA-Dallas"

2009:
Geraldo Rivera: "Host, Fox’s newsmagazine “Geraldo-at-Large”
Ysabel Durón: "Anchor, KRON-TV (San Francisco) “Weekend Morning News”
Juan Gonzalez: "Founder and Editor, El Tecolote; professor of journalism, City College of San Francisco"
 
2008:
Juan Gonzalez: "Columnist,  New York Daily News; former president, NAHJ"
Maggie Rivas-Rodriguez: "Professor, University of Texas at Austin, media activist"
Francisco P. Ramirez: "Founder, El Clamor Publico (Los Angeles)"
 
2007
Cecilia Alvear: "retired producer, NBC, former president, NAHJ"
Rigo Chacón: "three-time Emmy winner; president, Rigo Chacón and Associates (RCA)"
George Ramos: "a three-time Pulitzer Prize-winning reporter,  The Los Angeles Times; professor, California Polytechnic State University Journalism Department (San Luis Obispo, CA)"

2006:
Maria Elena Salinas: "veteran anchor, “Noticiero Univision”; founding member, NAHJ"
Henry Alfaro: "one of the first Mexican-American TV reporters, worked for 35 years at KABC-TV (Los Angeles)"

2005:
Gerald Garcia, Jr.: "former publisher, Tucson Citizen (Arizona); founding member and first president of NAHJ"

2004
Ignacio E. Lozano, Sr.: "founder, La Opinion"

2003:
Dr. Mary Adelaide Gardner: "former professor of journalism, Michigan State University; journalism Scholar"
Albor Ruiz: columnist, New York Daily News"

2002:
Paul Espinosa: "independent producer, writer and director"
Felix Gutiérrez: "author, educator and activist"
Frank del Olmo: "former associate editor, the Los Angeles Times"
Frank O. Sotomayor: "assistant METPRO director and hiring editor, Los Angeles Times"

2001:
Charlie Ericksen: "founder, Hispanic Link News Service; founding member of NAHJ"
Edith Sayre Auslander: "former reporter and editor, Arizona Daily Star; former professor, University of Arizona"
Peter Moraga: "a pioneer in radio journalism in California and Arizona"

2000:
Rubén Salazar: "columnist, the Los Angeles Times; news director, KMEX-DT"
Elma Barrera: "reporter, ABC Channel 13 – first Hispanic female reporter in the Houston market in 1972"
Sylvan Rodriguez: "former anchor, KHOU-TV 11 (Houston)"

Student chapters

See also

John Quiñones
Michelle Caruso-Cabrera
Alycia Lane
Soledad O'Brien
Liz Evora

References

Further reading
 Auerbach, Susan, ed. Encyclopedia of Multiculturalism (1998) vol 8 pp 2141-42.

External links

Organizations established in 1984
American journalism organizations
Journalism-related professional associations
Hispanic and Latino American professional organizations